The Paintsville Independent School District is a public school district based in Paintsville, Kentucky. The district serves the city of Paintsville. Its superintendent is David Gibson.

Administration

Board of Education

The board regularly meets on the second Monday of each month. The meetings are open to the public.

Members

David Gibson, Superintendent
Michael Short
Joseph Porter
Kay Hall
Marvin Walker

Schools
Paintsville Elementary School
Paintsville High School

References

Education in Johnson County, Kentucky
School districts in Kentucky
School districts established in 1889
1889 establishments in Kentucky